John Lafayette Camp (February 20, 1828 – July 16, 1891) was an American lawyer and planter from Texas who served in the Texas state Senate and as a district court judge.

John was born in Jefferson County, Alabama, the son of John and Elizabeth Camp. After graduating from the University of Tennessee in 1848 he moved to Gilmer in Upshur County, Texas. He started a plantation and was admitted to the bar. In 1851 he married Mary Ann Ward, the daughter of a local doctor. The couple would have five children, including John Lafayette, Jr.

Civil war
Camp entered to Civil War by joining the Confederate States Army. He joined the 14th Texas Cavalry Regiment and was elected Captain of his company. By the end of the war, he was Colonel of the 10th Texas Cavalry, and attached to the Army of Tennessee. He was in actions at Cumberland Gap, Murfreesboro, and Chickamauga. John was wounded and captured twice.

Political career
In 1866, the first district in Texas elected Camp to the U.S. Congress. However, in the struggle over seating of delegations connected with the Reconstruction, he was not allowed to take his seat. He remained active in Democratic Party politics.

Camp was elected to the Texas State Senate in 1874, and served from 1875 to 1878, when Governor Hubbard appointed him a judge in State district court. He resigned as a judge in 1878 due to poor health.

Later life
Camp moved to Arizona in 1884, working as a registrar in the land office. But, when the drier climate failed to improve his health, he came back to Texas two years later. He settled in San Antonio, living in his later years with his son, John Lafayette Camp, Jr. He died there in 1891 and is buried in the Dignowitty Cemetery.

Camp County, Texas was named for him after he introduced the Bill in the state Senate that created the county.

External links

References

1828 births
1891 deaths
Democratic Party Texas state senators
Texas lawyers
Texas state court judges
People from Jefferson County, Alabama
People from Cass County, Texas
People from Gilmer, Texas
People of Texas in the American Civil War
University of Tennessee alumni
American planters
Confederate States Army officers
Military personnel from San Antonio
Camp County, Texas
19th-century American politicians
19th-century American judges
19th-century American lawyers